Vjeran Zuppa (born 26 January 1940 in Split, Kingdom of Yugoslavia) is a Croatian intellectual,  dramaturge, literature theorist, poet, translator and former chairman of the Theater ITD

Zuppa graduated from the Faculty of Philosophy in Zagreb. He was editor of the well-known magazines at the time such as: Reason (1961–1967), Telegraph (1969–1971) and Notebook (1972–1975).

He was director of the Split Summer festival and the ITD theatre where he gained most fame. He ran the theater for 11 years (1966–1977) and provoked the Yugoslav government with critique plays. He was subsequently forced to shut the theater down.
In 1984, he joined the Academy of Dramatic Art, University of Zagreb as a professor and also as a dean from 2000 to 2004.

His most notable works are books from the field of literature critique and theory such as: The New European critique 1-3, Excuse for the songs and Lyric and habit.
He also wrote books of songs which include: Friend Silvester, Life and death of the hunter Luke and De rationes communi.
In 1999, he published Notebook. It was a review of the European culture policy and how it should be implemented in Croatia but it never came to a realization.

Zuppa established the "Center for dramatic arts", the institute called "Open society" and "The imaginative academy". 
He was introduced in the edition of "2000 outstanding scholars of the 20th century (IBC; Cambridge)", with the explanation: "in honor of an outstanding contribution in the field of dramatology".

Zuppa was also very politically active and gained a reputation as a left-wing intellectual. He was a member of the League of Communists of Croatia and the later reformed Social Democratic Party of Croatia (SDP). He left SDP in the early 1990s due to his opinion that Ivica Račan didn't change the authoritarian system of the party and that it didn't have any realistic social democratic platform.
He joined the Social Democratic Action of Croatia in 1994 but left it 2 years later after the death of its chairman Miko Tripalo.
He was very critical against the Franjo Tuđman regime during the 1990s which made him stay marginalized from the cultural policy during that time. He expressed his support for Vlado Gotovac at the time but refused to enter his Liberal Party due to ideological differences.

He later joined the SDP intellectual council in Zagreb but as a non-member. He supported the liberal-left coalition of SDP and HSLS in the Croatian parliamentary election, 2000. After the coalition won, Zuppa tried to become more involved in culture policy but in 2002, he resigned from his theater council post. After that, he stopped being involved in politics but continued to discuss it.

His notable and only book about the political discussion is Stretched out tongue. It contains a political and philosophical discussion with famous columnist Viktor Ivančić and a series of interviews about politics and theater given to various journalists from 1993 to 2005. The book was published by Feral Tribune in 2007.

References

1940 births
Living people
Writers from Split, Croatia
Croatian male poets
Croatian dramatists and playwrights
Faculty of Humanities and Social Sciences, University of Zagreb alumni